Count Marko Konstantinovich Ivelić (1740–1825) was a Serbian born Russian general from Risan who rose to prominence in Russian military service during the reign of Emperor Nicholas I of Russia and Prince-Bishop Petar I Petrović-Njegoš of Montenegro. He became a Russian general and count. In 1811 he was a diplomatic emissary to Revolutionary Serbia.

Ivelich of Risan
An old Risan family, the first Ivelich, according to some sources, settled in Risan at the time of the Nemanjić dynasty. Marko Ivelich  had two brothers Ivan Konstantinovich Ivelich, the youngest who was a major general in the Imperial Russian army, stationed at Vladikavkaz Garrison Regiment from 1805 to 1810, before he retired; and Semyon Konstantinovich Ivelich, also a high-ranking military officer. His nephew Peter Ivelich fought in the Battle of Borodino and many other battles against Napoleonic France. The Ivelich family produced four high-ranking military officers in the Imperial Russian Army.

Military career
Marko's education and military career began in the Republic of Venice. There he received the rank of lieutenant before he moved to Imperial Russia. Marko joined the Russian admiral Aleksei Grigoryevich Orlov in 1770 and participated in the fight against the Turks in Boka Kotorska. He was a commander of a part of the Russian Mediterranean fleet. The Russian fleet was under the overall command of Chesmensky, an honorific surname given to Admiral Orlov by Catherine the Great after he defeated the Turkish fleet at the Battle of Chesma, not far from the island of Chios. Marko Ivelić and over a hundred sailors from Boka Kotorska participated in that battle. When the war against the Turks began again in 1788, he was again sent to Montenegro and Herzegovina to stir up the local population; at the same time, he was assigned to form 12 battalions composed of Serbs and other Slavs and to act with them independently. Ivelich successfully completed the task assigned to him and repeatedly defeated the Turks. He became a General of the Russian army in 1800.

In 1805, for the third time sent to Montenegro to induce people to participate in the war against the French. Arriving in the Kotor region after the unsuccessful Battle of Austerlitz, when Venice and the Dalmatian coast were ceded to France by agreement, Ivelich nevertheless managed to arouse the population to resist, which contributed a lot to the success of further actions of Admiral Dmitry Senyavin's Second Archipelago Expedition. In 1812, Marko was sent with a diplomatic mission to Wallachia and then contributed to the conclusion of peace between the Turks and Serbs following the Treaty of Bucharest (1812), which in turn became very unpopular among the Serbs, since it failed to achieve any of the political aims of the First Serbian uprising. He secured for the Russian troops to enter  Šabac and Belgrade fortress, for which he had a falling out with Karađorđe, who also, as did Peter I of Montenegro earlier, accused him of being more a proponent of Russian interests than of his own compatriots 

In 1814, Ivelich became a senator and an officeholder in the Russian-American Company.

See also
 Peter Ivanovich Ivelich
 Andrei Miloradovich
 Jovan Horvat
 Nikolay Depreradovich
 Ivan Adamovich
 Ilya Duka
 Ivan Lukačević (soldier)
 Jovan Tekelija
 Matija Zmajević
 Marko Ivanovich Voinovich
 Jovan Albanez
 Jovan Šević
 Simeon Piščević
 Semyon Zorich
 Georgi Emmanuel
 Anto Gvozdenović
 Mikhail Miloradovich
 Pavle Julinac
 Dmitry Horvat
 Nikolai Dimitrievich Dabić
 Nikolai Kuznetsov (admiral)

References 

 Portrait of Marko Ivelich by sea-painter Vasilije Ivanković: https://www.museummaritimum.com/elementi/slike/ivelic2.jpg

Russian soldiers

1740 births
1825 deaths